Hylopanchax is a genus of poeciliids native to the Congo River Basin and Ivindo River in Middle Africa.

Species
There are currently 6 recognized species in this genus:

 Hylopanchax leki van der Zee, Sonnenberg & Schliewen, 2013
 Hylopanchax moke van der Zee, Sonnenberg & Schliewen, 2013
 Hylopanchax multisquamatus Bragança, van der Zee, Sonnenberg & Vreven, 2020
 Hylopanchax ndeko van der Zee, Sonnenberg & Schliewen, 2013
 Hylopanchax paucisquamatus  Sonnenberg, Friel & van der Zee, 2014
 Hylopanchax silvestris Poll & J. G. Lambert, 1958
 Hylopanchax stictopleuron Fowler, 1949 (Blue lampeye)
 Hylopanchax thysi Bragança, van der Zee, Sonnenberg & Vreven, 2020

References

Poeciliidae
Freshwater fish of Central Africa
Congo drainage basin
Freshwater fish genera
Taxa named by Max Poll
Ray-finned fish genera